Zhenfeng may refer to:

Zhenfeng County, in Guizhou, China
Zhenfeng Pagoda, in Anqing, Anhui, China